Wari River is a river of northern Ethiopia and a tributary of the Tekezé River. Tributaries of the Wari include the Assam, Chemit, Meseuma, Tsedia, Agefet and Tsaliet rivers.
The general drainage is westward, to the Tekezze River. Main tributaries in Dogu’a Tembien district are, from upstream to downstream
 Agefet River
 Amblo River, in tabia Addi Walka
 Azef River, at the border of tabias Addi Walka and Haddinnet
 Ab'aro River, in tabia Haddinnet and woreda Kola Tembien
 May Leiba, in tabia Ayninbirkekin, which becomes Tinsehe R. in Selam and Mahbere Sillasie, and Tsaliet River, downstream from the Dabba Selama monastery
 Khunale River, in tabia Selam
 Harehuwa River, in tabia Mahbere Sillasie
 Kidan Mihret River, in tabia Mahbere Sillasie
 Ferrey River, at the border of tabias Mahbere Sillasie and Degol Woyane

See also 
 List of rivers of Ethiopia

References 

Atbarah River
Rivers of Ethiopia